Norman Frederick Henderson Berlis (8 April 191410 May 2003) was a Canadian diplomat. He was Secretary and Officer-in-charge Permanent Delegation to the United Nations in Geneva then High Commissioner to Tanganyika, Tanzania then Uganda. He was also ambassador to Kenya and High Commissioner to Zanzibar and then the Ambassador Extraordinary and Plenipotentiary to Poland, Austria (where, since 1971, Canadian Ambassadors to Austria have been accredited to the Office of the United Nations at Vienna), and to the United Nations Industrial Development Organization then to Denmark. During his time as ambassador to Austria, on behalf of the Government of Canada he signed Canada's Comprehensive Safeguards Agreement under the Treaty on the Non-Proliferation of Nuclear Weapons with the International Atomic Energy Agency's Sigvard Eklund.

Notes and references

External links 
 Foreign Affairs and International Trade Canada Complete List of Posts

1914 births
2003 deaths
High Commissioners of Canada to Tanzania
High Commissioners of Canada to Uganda
High Commissioners of Canada to Kenya
Ambassadors of Canada to Poland
Ambassadors of Canada to Austria
Ambassadors of Canada to Denmark
Ambassadors to Tanganyika
Ambassadors to Zanzibar